Jan Lundqvist (born 4 August 1926) is a Swedish geologist. He is son of Gösta Lundqvist and brother of Thomas Lundqvist, both of whom are geologists. Jan Lundqvist worked at Geological Survey of Sweden from 1951 to 80 and obtained a Ph.D. degree in Quaternary geology at Stockholms högskola in 1958, becoming in also a teacher in that institution. Jan Lundqvist is considered among the foremost authorities on the Quaternary geology of Fennoscandia.

References

External links
Stockholms universitet - Jan Lundqvist

Stockholm University alumni
20th-century Swedish geologists
Quaternary geologists
1926 births
Living people
Members of the Royal Swedish Academy of Sciences